Otto "Proc" Klum (October 17, 1892 – September 24, 1944) was an American football and basketball coach.  He served as the head football coach at the University of Hawaii from 1921 to 1939.  Klum is the most successful coach in Hawaii football history having compiled a career record of 84–51–7.  His 1925 team went 10–0.  Klum was also the head basketball coach at Hawaii for two seasons from 1921 to 1923, tallying a mark of 13–8. Klum was notorious for running up the score. In the 1926 season, his team scored more than 100 points twice. His teams also scored more than 80 points in two other games in 1923 and 1925.

Klum died on September 24, 1944, of a heart attack near Ashland, Oregon.  He was born in Talent, Oregon on October 17, 1892. Klum Gym, on the University of Hawaii's Manoa campus, is named after the former coach.  Klum is an inductee of the Hawaii Sports Hall of Fame.

Head coaching record

Football

References

External links
 Hawaii Sports Hall of Fame profile
 

1892 births
1944 deaths
American men's basketball coaches
Basketball coaches from Oregon
Hawaii Rainbow Warriors and Rainbow Wahine athletic directors
Hawaii Rainbow Warriors baseball coaches
Hawaii Rainbow Warriors basketball coaches
Hawaii Rainbow Warriors football coaches
Sportspeople from Ashland, Oregon